Church House Publishing is the official publisher of the Church of England and was founded in 1986.

References 

Book publishing companies of the United Kingdom
Publishing companies established in 1986
1986 establishments in the United Kingdom